Faggeta Lekoma (Amharic: ፋግታ ለኮማ) is a woreda in Amhara Region, Ethiopia. The woreda is named in part after two former districts: Faggeta, best known as the location for the Battle of Faggeta (9 December 1769), where Ras Mikael Sehul with the help of Goshu of Amhara and Wand Bewossen defeated Fasil of Damot; and Lekoma, where Emperor Susenyos quashed a revolt of the local Agaw in 1614. Part of the Agew Awi Zone, Faggeta Lekoma is bordered on the south by Banja Shekudad, on the west by Guangua, on the north by Dangila, and on the east by the Mirab Gojjam Zone. Towns in Faggeta Lekoma include Addis Kidame and Faggeta.

Demographics
Based on the 2007 national census conducted by the Central Statistical Agency of Ethiopia (CSA), this woreda has a total population of 126,367, an increase of 29.68% over the 1994 census, of whom 62,728 are men and 63,639 women; 8,906 or 7.05% are urban inhabitants. With an area of 653.39 square kilometers, Faggeta Lekoma has a population density of 193.40, which is greater than the Zone average of 107.44 persons per square kilometer. A total of 26,774 households were counted in this woreda, resulting in an average of 4.72 persons to a household, and 26,180 housing units. The majority of the inhabitants practiced Ethiopian Orthodox Christianity, with 99.9% reporting that as their religion.

The 1994 national census reported a total population for this woreda of 97,446 in 18,679 households, of whom 48,678 were men and 48,768 were women; 4,501 or 4.62% of its population were urban dwellers. The two largest ethnic groups reported in Faggeta Lekoma were the Amhara (51.03%), and the Awi (48.89%) one of the Agaw peoples; all other ethnic groups made up 0.08% of the population. Amharic was spoken as a first language by 61.52%, and 38.44% spoke Awngi; the remaining 0.04% spoke all other primary languages reported. The majority of the inhabitants practiced Ethiopian Orthodox Christianity, with 99.86% reporting that as their religion.

Notes

Districts of Amhara Region